Dance Plus (tagline: Ise Kehte Hain Dance) is an Indian Hindi-language reality dance competition television series produced by Frames Production house and Urban Brew Studios. The seasons hosted by Raghav Juyal. The series features dance performers, including solo acts, Duo and larger groups, representing any style of dance, competing for a grand prize.

Series Overview

Judges & captains

Season 1 

Season 1 of Dance Plus premiered on 3 July 2015. V Company from Team Dharmesh won Season 1, Question Mark Crew from Team Sumeet was first runner up and Hardik Rawat from Team Dharmesh was second runner up. Kumar Priyadarshi is one of the editor of this season of Dance Plus.

Teams

Season 2 

Season 2 of Dance Plus started on 2 July 2016. The auditions took place across several cities of India from 3 May 2016 to 26 May 2016.Tanay Malhara from Team Dharmesh won the second season.

There are three mentors: 
Dharmesh Yelande
Shakti Mohan
Punit Pathak

Teams

Season 3 

Season 3 of Dance Plus started on 1 July 2017. Bir Radha Sherpa of Team Punit won the third season.

Judges:
 Dharmesh Yelande
 Shakti Mohan
 Punit Pathak

Teams

Season 4 

Season 4 of Dance Plus was started from 6 October 2018 Saturday at 8 pm. The channel Star Plus released the first promo of the show. It was hosted by Raghav Juyal and Sugandha Mishra. Chetan Salunkhe of Team Punit won the fourth season.

The Super Judge was Remo D'souza. The other judges were:

 Dharmesh Yelande
 Shakti Mohan
 Punit Pathak

Team Raghav Juyal
An all-kids crew named S-Unity Crew made a special appearance on the show as Team Raghav. They later shifted to Team Dharmesh after getting into the top 10.

Season 5 

Season 5 of Dance Plus started airing from 9 November 2019 at 8 pm, hosted by Raghav Juyal and Sugandha mishra (as guest). Rupesh bane from team Dharmesh became the winner of season 5. Janam from team Punit became the runner-up of season 5

The Super Judge is Remo D'Souza. The other judges are:

Dharmesh Yelande
 Karishma Chavan
Punit Pathak
 Suresh Mukund

Contestant Info

Season 6 

The sixth season aired on 13 September 2021 on Disney+ Hotstar. The show hosted by Raghav Juyal with the super judge Remo D'Souza and the team captains are Punit Pathak, Shakti Mohan and Salman Yusuff Khan. Harsh, Tejas, Sneha from team Shakti won Season 6 (in all of her 5 seasons of being a captain, this is the first win of team Shakti).

Contestant info

See also
 Dance Champions
 Dance India Dance
 India's Got Talent
 India's Best Dancer

References

External links

Dance+ on Hotstar

2015 Indian television series debuts
Indian reality television series
Indian dance television shows
Hindi-language television shows
Television shows set in Mumbai
StarPlus original programming
Frames Production series
Hindi-language Disney+ Hotstar original programming